Carl Clarence Kiess (October 18, 1887 – October 16, 1967) was an American astronomer.  His main contributions was in the study of solar and stellar spectra.

Kiess was born in Fort Wayne, Indiana. He earned a BA in astronomy from Indiana University in 1910 and a PhD from the University of California, Berkeley in 1913. After teaching at the University of Missouri, Pomona College, and the University of Michigan, Kiess took a position at the National Bureau of Standards in 1917. He retired from the bureau in 1957.

While working at the Lick Observatory on July 6, 1911, Kiess discovered comet C/1911 N1, which was named after him. A lunar crater and the asteroid 1788 were also named after him.

Kiess was a recipient of an honorary doctorate degree from the Indiana University.

References

1887 births
1967 deaths
American astronomers
Discoverers of comets
Indiana University Bloomington alumni
University of California, Berkeley alumni
People from Fort Wayne, Indiana
University of Michigan faculty
Pomona College faculty